The Riga Masters or Riga Open until 2016 (also known as the  Kaspersky Riga Masters for sponsorship reasons) is a ranking snooker tournament. The tournament started in 2014 as a part of the Players Tour Championship and was staged at the Arena Riga in Riga, Latvia. It was the opening ranking event of the season after becoming a ranking event in 2016, until 2019. Yan Bingtao is the reigning champion.

Winners

References

 
Recurring sporting events established in 2014
2014 establishments in Latvia
Players Tour Championship
International sports competitions hosted by Latvia
Sports competitions in Riga
Snooker minor-ranking tournaments
Snooker ranking tournaments
Summer events in Latvia